Carissa bispinosa grows as a shrub or small tree up to  tall. Its fragrant flowers feature a white corolla. The fruit is red when ripe. Vernacular names for the plant include "forest num-num" and "Y-thorned carissa". Carissa bispinosa is native an area from Uganda to South Africa.

References

External links
 PlantZAfrica.com
 Images on iSpot
 

bispinosa
Flora of East Tropical Africa
Flora of South Tropical Africa
Flora of Swaziland
Flora of South Africa
Plants described in 1767